Butantã is a metro station on Line 4-Yellow of the São Paulo Metro operated by ViaQuatro. The station is located on Avenida Vital Brasil, 427. It has three entrances, and it connects with a SPTrans bus terminal adjacent to the station. It is planned to connect Line 4-Yellow with future Line 22 (Rebouças–Cotia).

Characteristics
The station is located in Avenida Vital Brasil, 427, in a crossing with Rua Pirajussara. Is an underground station, with side platforms and support rooms above the ground level, with structures in concrete and a metallic structure catwalk, fixated with braces above the platforms. The ViaQuatro employees' offices and technical and operational rooms are located in external buildings, what would have avoided, according to the Metro, many expropriations.

The station has 9 ratchets, 14 escalators and 5 elevators, beside platform security doors (PSDs) in the platforms. It has access to people with disabilities and connection with urban bus terminal.

Its capacity was projected for an average of 35,000 daily passengers.

Station layout

References

São Paulo Metro stations
Railway stations located underground in Brazil
Railway stations opened in 2011
2011 establishments in Brazil